San Miguel, officially the Municipality of San Miguel, is a 5th class municipality in the province of Catanduanes, Philippines. According to the 2020 census, it has a population of 15,680 people.

It is located at the mid-south part of the province of Catanduanes, the only inland municipality of the island. It is bounded on the north by the municipality of Caramoran, on the east by the municipality of Baras and Gigmoto, on the west by the municipality of Virac and on the south by the municipality of Bato.

History

San Miguel, which was formerly part of the Municipality of Bato, was first inhabited by the early mountaineers and the part of the Malayan race that were pushed to the open valley with the coming of the Spanish Colonizers.

There are myths and fables about how the town got its name. According to a pioneer, San Miguel was once a sitio originally known as "Aguas" named after fish species bigger than the "Balanak". In the 1930s during the celebration of the feast in honor of Santa Cruz, the former patron saint, Aguas was changed to San Miguel in grateful recognition and commendation to the invaluable services of Don Miguel Triumfante and Juez de Cnado of Bato who were present then during the celebration.

There was also a legend handed down to the present generation that once upon a time the chapel caretaker in the person of Marcelo Tapanan, in one early morning heard a long and loud ringing of bells. He hurried to the chapel and was surprised to see the image of Saint Michael the Archangel in the altar. The story passed on every ear of the residents and finally made a common move of changing the name of the place from Aguas to San Miguel.

San Miguel became a separate municipality through then President Elpidio Quirino's Executive Order No. 803 dated August 23, 1952, comprising twelve barangays at that time. The first town mayor was Torribio Taopa who was chosen through a plebiscite in 1952 until the first local elections in 1953, which he won.

The present mayor is SP Francisco Camano Jr.

Geography

Barangays
San Miguel is politically subdivided into 24 barangays.

Climate

Demographics

Economy

Tourist attractions 

San Miguel River Park - is the largest fresh-water stream in the entire Catanduanes island, stretching from the middle of the island all the way to the south. It's best explored while on an inflatable tube or a kayak for a refreshing ride. The jump off station is located at Bgy. Kilikilihan, San Miguel.
Solong Falls - is a waterfall that is surrounded by trees. Located in Brgy. Solong, San Miguel.
Bontahiya Falls - is another waterfall in San Miguel.

References

External links
 [ Philippine Standard Geographic Code]
Philippine Census Information

Municipalities of Catanduanes
Establishments by Philippine executive order